Pervye Korosteli is a rural locality (a selo) in Kruglyansky Selsoviet, Uglovsky District, Altai Krai, Russia. The population was 86 as of 2013. It was founded in 1857. There are three streets.

Geography 
Pervye Korosteli is located 35 km southeast of Uglovskoye (the district's administrative centre) by road. Gorkov is the nearest rural locality.

References 

Rural localities in Uglovsky District, Altai Krai